Klassekampen ('The Class Struggle') was a Norwegian newspaper. It was established in 1909 as an organ for the youth movement of the Norwegian Labour Party, Norges socialdemokratiske ungdomsforbund. Its editor-in-chief from 1911 to 1921 was Eugène Olaussen.

At the Labour-Communist party split in 1923, the newspaper was usurped by the Young Communist League of Norway. Its first editor-in-chief following the split was Jørgen Vogt. It ceased to exist during  the German occupation of Norway in 1940, and did not resurface after the occupation.

References

Communist Party of Norway newspapers
Defunct newspapers published in Norway
Newspapers published in Norway
Norwegian-language newspapers
Newspapers established in 1909
Publications disestablished in 1940
1909 establishments in Norway
1940 disestablishments in Norway